HMS Icarus was one of nine s built for the Royal Navy during the 1930s.

Description
The I-class ships were improved versions of the preceding H-class. They were powered by two Parsons geared steam turbines, each driving one propeller shaft, using steam provided by three Admiralty three-drum boilers. Their crew numbered 145 officers and ratings.

The ships mounted four 4.7-inch (120 mm) Mark IX guns in single mounts, designated 'A', 'B', 'X' and 'Y' from bow to stern. For anti-aircraft (AA) defence, they had two quadruple mounts for the 0.5 inch Vickers Mark III machine gun. The I class was fitted with two above-water quintuple torpedo tube mounts for  torpedoes. One depth charge rack and two throwers were fitted; 16 depth charges were originally carried, but this increased to 35 shortly after the war began. Icarus was one of the four I-class destroyers fitted with minelaying equipment in late 1938 – January 1939 at Malta. This consisted of mounts for rails on the deck on which to carry the mines and an electric winch to move the mines down the rails. A pair of sponsons were added to the stern to allow the mines to clear the propellers when dropped into the sea. 'A' and 'Y' guns and both sets of torpedo tubes were modified to allow them to be removed to compensate for the weight of the mines. The ships could carry a maximum of 72 mines. The I-class ships were fitted with the ASDIC sound detection system to locate submarines underwater.

Construction and career

Service 1939-40
Kingston was able to launch a successful depth charge attack, forcing the U-boat to surface and scuttle itself.

Icarus participated in the Norwegian campaign in 1940, first capturing the 8,514 ton German supply ship  (brought to the United Kingdom and renamed Empire Endurance) on 11 April and then taking part in the Second Battle of Narvik on 13 April 1940.

She participated in Operation Dynamo, the evacuation from Dunkirk in late May and early June 1940.

Bismarck breakout
In early May 1941, the British Admiralty was on the alert that the Bismarck might attempt to break out into the North Atlantic; so Icarus was ordered to Scapa Flow for possible deployment against the Germans. The intention was that the force would refuel in Hvalfjord, Iceland, and then sail again to watch the Denmark Strait.

On the evening of 23 May, the weather deteriorated. At 20:55 hrs., Admiral Lancelot Holland aboard Hood signalled the destroyers "If you are unable to maintain this speed I will have to go on without you. You should follow at your best speed." At 02:15 on the morning of 24 May, the destroyers were ordered to spread out at  intervals to search to the north. At about 05:35, the German forces were sighted by Hood, and shortly after, the Germans sighted the British ships. Firing commenced at 05:52. At 06:01, Hood took a  shell from Bismarck in the after magazine, which caused a massive explosion, sinking the ship within 2 minutes.

Upon hearing that Hood had sunk, Electra raced to the area, arriving about two hours after Hood went down. They were expecting to find many survivors, and rigged scrambling nets and heaving lines, and placed life belts on the deck where they could be quickly thrown in. From the 94 officers and 1,321 ratings aboard Hood, just three survivors were found. Electra rescued them, and continued searching.  Shortly thereafter, Icarus and Anthony joined in the search, and the three ships searched the area for more survivors.  No more were found, only driftwood, debris, and a desk drawer filled with documents. After several hours searching, they left the area.

Later service
She participated in Operation Pedestal, escorting a convoy to Malta in August 1942.

Icarus was involved in many important events of the Second World War, Dunkirk, Spitzbergen, and numerous Atlantic and Russian convoys.

Icarus sank four German U-boats:
All 43 hands on board survived.
 On 21 January 1945 she sank  while in company with the corvette  in the English Channel near the Isles of Scilly.

A long-time captain of Icarus, Colin Maud, was the Juno beach master at the D-day landings; in the film The Longest Day, he was played by Kenneth More, complete with bulldog.

Lieutenant-Commander John Simon Kerans, famous for his part in sailing , down the Yangtze River, a feat made famous in the film Yangtse Incident, also served in Icarus as "number one".

Icarus was paid off on 29 August 1946, handed over to the British Iron & Steel Corporation on 29 October 1946 and broken up at Troon in Scotland.

Notes

Bibliography

External links
 Icarus at Uboat net
 Icarus service history at naval-history.net

 

I-class destroyers of the Royal Navy
Ships built on the River Clyde
1936 ships
World War II destroyers of the United Kingdom